The East Field is located to the east of the Great Pyramid of Giza and contains cemetery G 7000. This cemetery was a burial place for some of the family members of Khufu. The cemetery also includes mastabas from tenants and priests of the pyramids dated to the 5th and 6th Dynasty.

The East Field consists of the three Queen's pyramids and a number of mastabas labeled Cemetery G 7000. Reisner constructed a timeline for the construction of the East Field. The first two Queen's Pyramids, G 1a and G 1b, were likely started in year 15-17 of King Khufu. Usually Queen's pyramids were constructed to the south of the king's pyramid, but in this instance a quarry was located to the south and the construction of the smaller pyramids was relocated to the east of the main pyramid complex. 
The earliest part of the cemetery consisted of 12 mastabas which were built as double mastabas. They were laid out in three rows of four tombs: 
 G 7110-7120 Kawab and Hetepheres II and G 7130-7140 Khufukhaf I and his wife Nefertkau II
 G 7210-7220 Hordjedef and his wife and G 7230-7240
 G 7310-7320 Baufra and G 7330-7340
The construction of these tombs has been dated to ca year 17-24 of the reign of Khufu. This core was then completed to create a nucleus of eight twin-mastabas by the construction of:
 G 7410-7420 Meresankh II and Horbaef and G 7430-7440 Minkhaf I
The rest of the eastern field was built around this group of eight twin mastabas. Of these the great mastaba G 7510 of king's son and vizier Ankhhaf stands out due to its size. The construction of several other mastabas can be dated to the time of King Khafre. G 7530 + 7540, the tomb of Meresankh III, contains quarry inscriptions dating to year 13 of that king. Mastaba G 7050, belonging to Nefertkau I, was built during the reign of Khafre as well. Further additions date to the end of the 4th, 5th and 6th dynasty and even later.

Queen's pyramids

Pyramid G 1a was at first thought to belong to Queen Meritites I but Lehner has shown that the pyramid belonged to Hetepheres I instead. All three pyramids have a square base measuring about 45 – 49 m. on a side. The angle of inclination is about 51° 50‘ for all three.

Shaft tomb:

Cemetery G 7000 

Nucleus of Cemetery G 7000

The later additions to the cemetery:

See also
 Giza West Field

References

External links
 The Giza Archives Website maintained by the Museum of Fine Arts in Boston. Quote: "This website is a comprehensive resource for research on Giza. It contains photographs and other documentation from the original Harvard University - Boston Museum of Fine Arts Expedition (1904 to 1947), from recent MFA fieldwork, and from other expeditions, museums, and universities around the world.".
While still reachable the Giza Archives became Digital Giza in 2011 and is maintained by Harvard. Website can be reached here.

Giza Plateau
Archaeological sites in Egypt
Ancient Egypt
Giza pyramid complex
Cemeteries in Egypt